Smyha is an urban-type settlement in Dubno Raion (district) of Rivne Oblast (province) in western Ukraine. Its population is 3,015 as of the 2001 Ukrainian Census. Current population: 

The settlement was first founded in 1861 as the village of Kenneberg. It was renamed to its current name "Smyha" in 1928, and it acquired the status of an urban-type settlement in 1980.

Images

References

Urban-type settlements in Dubno Raion
Populated places established in 1861
1861 establishments in the Russian Empire